Aram Bagh ( meaning Garden of relaxation), formerly known as Ram Bagh ( meaning Garden of Ram) is a neighborhood located in historic center of Karachi, Pakistan that was built around the Aram Bagh Park. Aram Bagh has a high concentration of listed and protected heritage buildings, with many in a good state of conservation.

History 
There has been an abundance of water in the Ram Bagh area of Karachi since ancient times and many wells were dug here to supply water to the residents that settled around it. According to Hindu belief, the Hindu avatars  Ram, Sita and Lakshman stayed at this location on their way to Hinglaj pilgrimage after spending 14 years in a jungle. Since that time, Ram Bagh became a place of pilgrimage for Hindus. Arif Hasan claims Karachi was called Ramya in some Greek texts.

The British built an army cantonment in Ram Bagh area after they conquered Karachi from the Kalmati in 1839. The Ram Bagh Quarter had three water tanks, including a prominent one named the Rambagh Tank, which was 9 acres in size. The British named the entire locality as Ram Bagh after this water tank. Wells in Ram Bagh were used to supply the British Cantonment to the east. During the 1857 Mutiny against British rule, rebels were blasted by canons by the British forces in Ram Bagh.

In 1939, Deewan Jethanand built Ram Bagh -a park positioned near Swami Narayan temple, which is located on the nearby Burns Road. Ram Bagh was used for Hindu religious gatherings and celebrations, as well as political gatherings. The Ramlila story was enacted in Ram Bagh annually which lasted ten days.

During the partition of British India in 1947, some homes of the Hindu community in Ram Bagh were looted; during this time, thousands of Muslim refugees from India set up camps in Ram Bagh and it was renamed as Aram Bagh i.e. Garden of relaxation, to mark the end of their arduous journey to Pakistan. The area is still home to about 40 Hindu families, who report good relations with their Muslim neighbors.

Religious sites 
The Shiv Mandir is located in Aram Bagh and is open on Monday evenings. It was built by Astan Shrimati Hajeebai in memory of Ram Mangat Ram, her husband. Aram Bagh is also home to the Rameshwar Mahadev Mandir, built in the 1920s and still in use. In the past, Ram Bagh also contained the Ram Chandur Temple, among three other mandirs, each of which were "situated at the four corners of the Tank." 

Aram Bagh Masjid, as well as the Shiv Mandir and Swami Narayan Mandir, are located in the Aram Bagh area. The Aram Bagh Masjid was built in Aram Bagh, atop the stage on which Ramlila performances occurred, by the Muslims refugees that settled around the Aram Bagh. 

Aram Bagh is also home to a functioning Sikh temple, the Guru Nanak Satsang Sabha Gurdwara, built in 1935, which serves the small Sikh community of Aram Bagh as well as Nanakpanthi Hindus The Gurdwara had come under of Hindu residents until 2016, when the Pakistani Supreme Court ordered it to be handed back to the Sikh community.

Heritage buildings 

As per the Sindh Directorate of Antiquities:

Protected

Unprotected

See also 

Jehangir Kothari Parade
Bagh Ibne Qasim
Mazar-e-Quaid
Karachi Zoo
List of parks and gardens in Pakistan
List of parks and gardens in Lahore
List of parks and gardens in Karachi
PAF Museum Park
Maritime Museum Park
Hill Park
Safari Park
Jheel Park
Bagh-e-Quaid-e-Azam
Aziz Bhatti Park
List of parks in Karachi

References

External links 
List of heritage sites in Aram Bagh
The story of Ram Bagh
 Infiltration by the gods
 Aram Bagh to be declared heritage site 
 Aram Bagh Masjid
 Aram Bagh Park
 From Rambagh to Arambagh 
 Aram Bagh Ground

Parks in Karachi